Black Fire may refer to:

Film
 Black Fire (film) (Fuoco nero), 1951 Italian film 
 Black fire (also titled Blackfire), 1972 Australian short film by Bruce McGuinness

Literature
 Black Fire: An Anthology of Afro-American Writing, co-edited in 1968 by Amiri Baraka and Larry Neal
 Black Fire (novel), a Star Trek novel

Other uses
 Black Fire (2022), the third-largest wildfire in New Mexico
 Black Fire (album), a 1964 album by Andrew Hill
  Black Fire (video game), a 1995 3D helicopter combat game

See also
 Blackfire (disambiguation)
 Green Fire
 Silver fire (disambiguation)
 White Fire